Mrs. Pollifax–Spy is a 1971 American comedy film directed by Leslie H. Martinson, starring Rosalind Russell, Darren McGavin, and Nehemiah Persoff. It was released by United Artists. Russell wrote the screenplay for the film, which she adapted from the novel The Unexpected Mrs. Pollifax by Dorothy Gilman. Russell used the pen name "C. A. McKnight," which was taken from her mother's maiden name. It was Russell's last role in a theatrically released film.

Plot
Mrs. Emily Pollifax, a widow from New Jersey, volunteers to be a spy for the CIA, believing she is "expendable" now that her children are grown. Being just what the agency needed (someone who looks and acts completely unlike a spy), Mrs. Pollifax is assigned to simple courier duty to pick up a book in Mexico City. However, things do not unfold as planned. She is kidnapped and finds herself imprisoned in communist Albania, and must use her wits to escape.

Cast
Rosalind Russell as Mrs. Pollifax
Darren McGavin as Farrell
Nehemiah Persoff as Berisha
Harold Gould as Nexhdet
Albert Paulsen as Perdido

References

External links

1970s spy comedy films
1971 films
1971 comedy films
Films based on American novels
Films directed by Leslie H. Martinson
Films scored by Lalo Schifrin
United Artists films
1970s English-language films